Longitergite is an extinct genus of prawn which existed in Russia during the Lower Miocene period. It contains a single species.

References

Penaeidae
Miocene crustaceans
Fossils of Russia